"London Still" is a single by the Australian folk-rock band The Waifs, coming from their album Up All Night. "London Still" was written by Donna Simpson. The single was nominated for several ARIA awards, including Breakthrough Artist - Single, and Best Independent Release. It placed third on Australian radio station Triple J's Hottest 100 list for 2002.

Reception
Junkee said, "The Waifs' heartfelt, plucked ode to missing home resonated with every Australian that has ever found themselves in a far-flung, cold place somewhere across the globe. Inside Josh Cunningham's scratched and ringing guitar was the warmth of a Perth summer's day, as Australian as a crinkled eucalyptus leaf."

Track listing
 London Still  
 Crazy Train  
 Lies  
 Here If You Want 
 Jealousy

Charts

References

The Waifs songs
2003 singles